Shodroda is a rural locality (a selo) in Chankovsky Selsoviet, Botlikhsky District, Republic of Dagestan, Russia. The population was 808 as of 2010. There are 3 streets.

Geography 
Shodroda is located 18 km northwest of Botlikh (the district's administrative centre) by road. Ansalta is the nearest rural locality.

References 

Rural localities in Botlikhsky District